Tuban District is a district of the Lahij Governorate, Yemen. As of 2003, the district had a population of  83,444 people.

References

Districts of Lahij Governorate